Molten salt oxidation is a non-flame, thermal process that destroys all organic materials while simultaneously retaining inorganic and hazardous components in the melt. It is used as either hazardous waste treatment (with air) or energy harvesting similar to coal and wood gasification (with steam).
The molten salt of choice has been sodium carbonate (m.p 851°C), but other salts can be used. Sulfur, halogens, phosphorus and similar volatile pollutants are oxidized and retained in the melt. Most organic carbon content leaves as relatively pure CO//H2/H2O gas (depending on the feed conditions, whether steam or air is used), and the effluent only requires a cold trap and a mild aqueous wash (except mercury-containing wastes). It has been used for safe biological and chemical weapons destruction, and processing waste such as scrap tires where direct incineration/effluent treatment is difficult.
The major downside of the process compared to direct incineration is the eventual saturation of the melt by contaminants, and needing reprocessing/replacement.

See also
 Recovery boiler - a technology with similar issues used in Kraft process chemical pulping of paper, though temperatures <500°C

Waste management
Waste treatment technology